The following is a list of players who have played for Zamalek SC, an Egyptian football club.

Ali wael

From the beginning to the end of the eighties

The nineties

The Millennium period The first decade

The Millennium period The second decade

References

 
Association football player non-biographical articles
Zamalek